"Hold My Hand" is a duet performed by American singer-songwriters Michael Jackson and Akon, from Jackson's first posthumous album Michael (2010). The song was originally recorded by Akon and Jackson in 2007. The song was an international top 10 hit in nations such as Austria, Belgium, Denmark, Germany, Hungary, Italy, New Zealand, Norway, Poland, Spain, Sweden, Switzerland and the United Kingdom.

Background 
Co-writer Claude Kelly told HitQuarters that "Hold My Hand" was originally written with Whitney Houston in mind. Akon and Kelly had been in the studio working on songs for Houston's I Look to You album and while on his own Kelly completed the song from a track Akon had left. After hearing the song later, Akon said that he loved it and wanted to keep it for himself, so he wanted to record his own version of it. Shortly afterwards Akon went to Las Vegas to work on what would have been Michael Jackson's next album. While there, Jackson heard the song and loved it, and decided he wanted to contribute to it. When Kelly was asked what he thought it was about the song that struck a chord with both Akon and Jackson, he said that it was the song's theme of friendship and togetherness. "Hold My Hand" was recorded by Jackson and Akon in 2007. Akon finished the rest of his vocals for the song in 2010, a few days before the release. A handwritten note from Jackson belonging to his estate indicated his desire that “Hold My Hand” be the first single on his next project. However, in its unfinished state, the song leaked out in 2008. This would be the last new song leaked during Jackson's lifetime. Due to the leak, the song was subsequently pulled from Akon's track listing for his 2008 album, Freedom. Akon regretted the decision after Jackson died the next year and decided to finish the song in his honor.

Akon commented, “The world was not ready to hear ‘Hold My Hand’ when it leaked a couple years ago. We were devastated about it. But its time has definitely come; now in its final state, it has become an incredible, beautiful, anthemic song. I'm so proud to have had the chance to work with Michael, one of my all time idols.” Before the official release of the song, Akon stated on Twitter that the final version would have more of Jackson's vocals. The song was released globally on Monday, November 15, 2010, at 12:01am EST. It was available to stream from Jackson's official website. Jackson's nephew, Taj Jackson, posted a message saying that his uncle was proud of the song. "I'll never forget that smile he had on his face as the song played through the speakers [in his room] at the Palms Hotel in Vegas." The song is the second collaboration between the two artists and the second consecutive duet single release for Jackson, following "Wanna Be Startin' Somethin' 2008". That song proved a commercial success and charted within the top 20 in several countries.

Music video 
On Monday, November 22, 2010, the filming for the official video began in Tustin, California, a main filming location being the airship hangars at Marine Corps Air Station Tustin. There was a casting call posted up on Jackson's official website, saying that they were "looking for his fans of all ages who want to be a part of this iconic event." On December 4, 2010, a 30-second teaser of the video was released on Michael Jackson's official YouTube channel and the official website. It featured clips from Jackson's Live in Bucharest: The Dangerous Tour DVD and clips of fans dancing. The video debuted at midnight December 9, 2010 on worldwide websites, including MichaelJackson.com. The video showed Jackson in concert (from Dangerous World Tour in Bucharest and HIStory World Tour in Munich), Akon singing and children dancing in the dress of Jackson, as well as sentimental scenes of children, families, and elderly people holding hands and a woman weeping. The video was directed by Mark Pellington.

Critical reception
The song received mostly positive reviews in contrast to the negative reviews of the previous promotional single "Breaking News." Ashante Infantry, entertainment reporter for the Toronto Star, called it a "catchy, well-meaning addition to Jackson's catalog."  She also wrote, "Buoyed by strings and a backing chorus, the singer applies his angelic tenor to soaring phrasing that models the uplifting purport of the tune’s love and unity lyrics in the spirit of 1995’s "You Are Not Alone", Jackson’s last No. 1 hit." Huffington Post commentator Joe Vogel praised it as "a simple, but powerful song that embodies so much of what fans loved about Michael Jackson. Like U2’s "One" it is a “love song” that expands outward making the personal something more profound and universal", and added that "With its catchy chorus and majestic crescendo it has all the makings of a big hit." Vogel also noted the first line of the song, "This life don't last forever," was a "poignant reminder of the transience of life." MTV's Gil Kaufman stated that "the uplifting 'Hold My Hand' is one of Jackson's classic love ballads, a heart-stirring call to unity," and that it ended with "a majestic feel." Newsday music critic Glenn Gamboa said that the tune "finds Jackson in fine voice." He also remarked, "Now this is more like it." Gerrick D. Kennedy of the Los Angeles Times music blog wrote that the "mid-tempo uplifting track is classic M.J."

Negative reviews however came from Yahoo! Music, where commentator Chris Willman argued that the single stole elements from the Hootie & the Blowfish song of the same name, and Minneapolis City Pages where commentator Ray Cummings said "there's no way to reasonably avoid being disappointed and dispirited by its thinness." Michael Roffman from Consequence of Sound called the track "highly irritating" and "incredibly repetitive", where "Akon belts out the same thing again and again in an equally monotonous pitch", adding that "as a lead single it was tepid and incredibly campy."Boston Herald critic Jed Gottlieb described the song as "an average, Auto-Tuned Akon croon" without "the snap, crackle and pop of a finished King of Pop product." Gottlieb also wrote, "Jackson is grumbling from his grave." Jason Lipshutz from Billboard said, it "isn't a classic Jackson single," but Michael Jackson's "diehards should delight in hearing a stylish pop production that doesn't dwell on the singer's troubled life."

Commercial performance
The song debuted at number 53 on the Hot R&B/Hip-Hop Songs chart the week of November 27, 2010. It also became Michael Jackson's 48th hit on Billboard Hot 100, and debuted at number 84. It debuted on the Adult R&B chart at number 16 as the chart's highest start in 2010 the same week. The song is Jackson's first top 40 hit on the Billboard Hot 100 since 2002's "Butterflies". The song debuted at number 24 on the Billboard Jazz Songs Chart on the week of January 15, 2011, as Jackson's first single on this chart, it peaked at number 16. According to SoundScan, the song has sold 304,000 copies by the middle of January 2011.

Track listing
All tracks written by Akon, Giorgio Tuinfort, and Claude Kelly; produced by Akon and Tuinfort, with co-production by Jackson.

Personnel
Credits lifted from the liner notes of Michael.

Technical

Kory Aaron – vocal recording
Eelco Bakker – vocal recording
Serban Ghenea – mixing engineer
Franck van der Heijden – arranger
Michael Jackson – co-producer
Claude Kelly – writer
Wessel Oltheten – mixing engineer, recording engineer
Matt Paul – vocal recording
Justin Pintar – vocal recording
Miguel Scott – vocal recording
Akon – finisher, producer, programming, writer
Giorgio Tuinfort – finisher, producer, programming, writer
Ryan Wiese – vocal recording
Mack Woodward – vocal recording

Performers and musicians

Dennis Krijnen – orechestra
Arlia de Ruiter – violin
Pauline Terlouw – violin
Erica Korthals-Altes – violin
Vera Laporeva – violin
Sarah Koch – violin
Linda Dumessie – violin
Dennis Koenders – violin
Seija Teeuwen – violin
David Peijnenborgh – violin
Wim Kok – violin
Elizabeth Liefkes Cats – violin
Feyona van Iersel – violin
Vera van der Brie – violin
Erik Jan Kromhout – violin
Giorgio Tuinfort – grand piano
Mieke Honingh – alt violin
Isabella Petersen – alt violin
Iris Schut – alt violin
Rani Kumar – alt violin
Arjen de Graaf – alt violin
Emile Visser – celli
Maarten Jansen– celli
Michiel Weidner – celli
Jascha Albracht – celli
Erik Winkelman – contrabas
Pierre Buizer – horns
Iris Oltheten – horns
Alan Austin – choir
Anthony Brice – choir
Antoria Caston – choir
Richard Dale – choir
Eric Echols – choir
Charlene Gillead – choir
Valencia Green – choir
Cynthia Jones – choir
Iris McGhee – choir
Felicia Peavy – choir
Michelle Roberts – choir
Gina Taylor – choir
Dana Widener – choir
Terance Wilson – choir
Sandra Wright  – choir
Leo Wheat, Jr. – choir

Charts

Weekly charts

Year-end charts

Certifications

Release history

See also
 List of unreleased Michael Jackson material
 Death of Michael Jackson
 List of works published posthumously

References

2010 songs
2010 singles
2010s ballads
Michael Jackson songs
Akon songs
Songs written by Akon
Songs written by Claude Kelly
Song recordings produced by Michael Jackson
Song recordings produced by Akon
Songs released posthumously
Pop ballads
Contemporary R&B ballads
Male vocal duets
Songs written by Giorgio Tuinfort
Music videos directed by Mark Pellington
Epic Records singles